Sierra Trading Post, Inc., doing business as Sierra, is an online and brick-and-mortar retailer of off-price merchandise operated by the TJX Companies. The Framingham, Massachusetts–based company offers products in categories such as outdoor recreation, fitness and adventure gear, and apparel, along with footwear, clothing, and home decor. Sierra sells merchandise through 78 retail stores as of November 2022 and a company website. It carries products from approximately 3,000 name-brand manufacturers.

Sierratradingpost.com launched in December 1998 and was included in the "Internet Retailer Top 400 List" in 2004 and the "Top 500 List" in 2005, 2006, 2007, 2010 and 2011.

History
Sierra Trading Post was founded in Reno, Nevada, in 1986, and headquartered there until 1992. It was acquired for an estimated $200 million by Framingham, Massachusetts–based TJX Companies in 2012. 

The original company had  of office space. The existing stores average  of operating space. The business claims to hold to three guiding principles: to give optimal customer service, to maintain low operating costs to increase customer savings, and to "treat others as we would want to be treated".

On January 12, 2009, during the financial crisis, the company laid off approximately 130 employees at the retail and outlet store (and fulfillment center) in Cheyenne.

TJX acquired the domain sierra.com in August 2018 from Activision, which owned the assets of Sierra Entertainment. TJX subsequently shortened the name "Sierra Trading Post" to Sierra.

Catalogs
The first catalog had 16 pages of hand-drawn merchandise printed in duotone. As of December 2017, the catalog is no longer in production.

 The "core" catalog, titled Sierra, featured the broadest range of products.
 The Sierra catalog carried products for women balancing work, family and home. It included active and casual office wear, children's clothing, home decor and footwear.

Retail stores
The company operates brick-and-mortar stores in the United States. As a part of the TJX group of companies, a store is often near or within a HomeGoods, T.J. Maxx or Marshalls store in the same shopping center.

Notes

References

External links

 

TJX Companies
Economy of the Western United States
Online retailers of the United States
American companies established in 1986
Retail companies established in 1986
Internet properties established in 1998
2012 mergers and acquisitions
Companies based in Cheyenne, Wyoming
1986 establishments in Nevada
Sporting goods retailers of the United States